Jonathan Otter Self (born 11 March 1959 in Hammersmith, London) is an English author and journalist.

Early life
Self was raised in Hampstead, London. His father was the British journalist and academic Peter Self. His mother, Elaine (born Rosenbloom), was American and worked in publishing. His brother, Will Self, is a novelist and broadcaster.

Career
Self began his career as an advertising copywriter and in 1982 founded Self Direct, a direct-marketing agency. He sold the business in 1993.

In 2001, Self published an autobiography, Self Abuse. The Times stated that Self "is a talented writer with an extraordinary family history to relate. He catalogues the failings of a family so dysfunctional and cruel that even with his talent for sardonic one-liners the tone is one of unrelenting despair." In a humour column of The Guardian, a one-line summary of the book states, "The brother of the more famous Will ODs in therapy and splurges the results over 247 pages".

Self has since written a number of other books, including The Teenagers Guide to Money which was notably ranked as the #5 best investing book for teens by a UK financial education website. He has contributed regularly to the British media including Country Life, The Times, The Daily Telegraph and The Mail on Sunday. In 2009 he collaborated with Arabella Lennox-Boyd on "Welcome to Dream Acres", a Country Life series about landscape gardening.

He is one of the founders of Honey's, an ethical dog food company, which is the subject of one of his books.

Self acts as a Special Adviser to the World Land Trust, an environmental charity.

In 2016, he made a Radio 4 Charity Appeal on behalf of Room to Read.

Self is now a trustee of the Rainforest Trust.

Personal life
Self is married. He and his wife Rose have seven children between them.

Works 
Self Abuse (John Murray, 2001), a memoir
The Teenager's Guide to Money (Quercus, 2007), a personal finance guide for teenagers
Honey's Natural Feeding Handbook for Dogs (Mammoth, 2012), a guide to diets for dogs
Emerald (Thames & Hudson, 2013), a guide to the world's emerald trade
Good Money (Head of Zeus, 2017), a guide on how to become an ethical entrepreneur

References

Living people
1959 births
English male journalists
Jonathan